The 1929–30 season is FC Barcelona's 31st in existence, and was their second year in the Primera División, and covers the period from 1929-08-01 to 1930-07-31.

FC Barcelona won the Catalan League for the 16th time, their only title in the season.

First-team squad

Transfers

In

Out

Competitions

La Liga

League table

Results by round

Matches

Copa del Rey

Round of 32

Round of 16

Quarterfinals

Semifinals

Catalan football championship

League table

Matches

Friendlies

Results

References
BDFutbol
Webdelcule.com

FC Barcelona seasons
Barcelona